Salaam is a short form of As-salamu alaykum, an Arabic greeting meaning "Peace be upon you". This phrase and the Arabic word   'peace' derive from the Semitic root Š-L-M.

Salaam or Salam may also refer to:

Businesses and organizations
 Al-Salam SC, several sports teams
 Salaam TV, independent satellite television channel
 Salaam Bank, commercial bank headquartered in Bosaso, Somalia
 Salaam Somali Bank, commercial bank headquartered in Mogadishu, Somalia
 Salam, defunct newspaper in Iran
 Salam Zgharta FC, Lebanese association football club
 Zee Salaam, Indian Hindi- and Urdu-language Islamic TV channel owned by Zee Network

Music
 Salam, film score by Fariborz Lachini  
 Salam, song by Alabina
 "Salaam" (song), peace song by Mosh Ben Ari
 Salaam (album), album by Sami Yusuf
 Salam (album), album by Irfan Makki

People

Given name 
 Salaam bin Said Al Shaksy, chief executive
 Salaam Remi, American hip hop record producer

Surname 
 Abd al-Salam (name)
 Anbara Salam, Lebanese writer and activist
 Ephraim Salaam, American football player
 Florin Salam, Romanian manele singer
 H. Salam (active from 2021), Indian politician in Kerala
 Kawther Salam, Palestinian journalist
 Mohammed Ahmed Salam, Yemeni prisoner
 Abdul Salam Rocketi, Afghan military personnel
 Nawaf Salam, Lebanese diplomat, academic, jurist
 Rashaan Salaam, American football player 
 Salim Ali Salam, Lebanese statesman
 Saeb Salam, Lebanese politician
 Tammam Salam, Lebanese politician
 Waleed Al-Salam, mathematician

Places
 Salam, Chaharmahal and Bakhtiari, Iran (also known as Salm)
 Salam, Mali
 Salam Street, Abu Dhabi

Other uses
 Operation Salam, covert operation during World War II
 Salaam spasms or epileptic spasms, disorder
 Salam leaf or Indonesian bay leaf, leaf of a plant in the family Myrtaceae

See also
 El Salam Maritime Transport
 Lal Salam, salute, greeting or code word used by communists in South Asia
 Salem (disambiguation)
 Salim (disambiguation)
 Selam (Australopithecus), fossil specimen found in Dikika
 Shalom (disambiguation)

Names of God in Islam